Very Severe Cyclonic Storm Gaja was the sixth named cyclone of the 2018 North Indian Ocean cyclone season, after Cyclones Sagar, Mekunu, Daye, Luban, and Titli. Forming on November 5 as a low-pressure system over the Gulf of Thailand, the system crossed through Southern Thailand and the Malay Peninsula and eventually crossed into the Andaman Sea. The weak system intensified into a depression over the Bay of Bengal on November 10 and further intensified to a cyclonic storm on November 11, being named Gaja. After tracking west-southwestward for a number of days in the Bay of Bengal, Gaja made landfall in South India on November 16, moved westward through Vedaranyam, Thiruthuraipoondi, Mannargudi, Muthupet, Pudukkottai, Adirampattinam, Pattukkottai, and Peravurani. The storm survived its crossing into the Arabian Sea; however, it degenerated into a remnant low in hostile conditions only a few days later, before dissipating early on November 22. 45 people were killed by the storm. 8 people were killed in the town of Pattukottai alone. Gaja had severe impacts in South India, particularly in Tamil Nadu. After Cyclone Gaja, Tamil Nadu sought Rs 15,000 crore from Indian central government to rebuild.

Meteorological history

On November 5, a low-pressure system formed over the Gulf of Thailand. The system crossed through Southern Thailand and the Malay Peninsula on November 8. The next day, it crossed into the Andaman Sea and lingered there, organizing further throughout the day and intensified into a depression over the Bay of Bengal on November 10. The next day, the system was designated by the IMD as BOB 09. Soon after, the Joint Typhoon Warning Center (JTWC) issued a Tropical Cyclone Formation Alert (TCFA).

At 00:00 UTC on November 11, the deep depression strengthened into a cyclonic storm, and was given the name Gaja by the IMD. After tracking west-southwestward for a number of days, it made landfall near Nagapattinam in southern India, early on November 16, as a very severe cyclonic storm. Afterward, Gaja passed through Vedaranyam, Voimedu, Muthupet, Pattukkottai, Adirampattinam, and Mallipattinam on the same day. The storm survived crossing over into the Arabian Sea later that day and continued moving westward; however, it degenerated into a remnant low in hostile conditions only a few days later, on November 19. A couple of days later, early on November 22, the storm's remnants dissipated near Socotra.

Preparation, impacts and aftermath
Due to the possibility of adverse effects in the coastal regions of Tamil Nadu and Puducherry, early steps were taken by the state governments. About 80,000 were evacuated to 470 relief camps from the districts which were vulnerable to the cyclone in Tamil Nadu. Holidays were also announced in the coastal districts of the Cauvery delta region in Tamil Nadu as well as Puducherry. People were advised not to come out of the house, as the cyclone caused high winds. Preventative measures were explained through all media.

 About 86 thousand electric poles, eight hundred transformers, two hundred electricity substations, and 5 thousand boats were destroyed by the cyclone. Thousands of birds and livestock died due to the cyclone. About 18 thousand hectares of coconut trees were damaged, mostly uprooted. 56 thousand hectares of crops and trees were destroyed due to the cyclone. 52 people died, mostly in the districts of Thiruvarur, Thanjavur, and Nagapattinam.

See also

 Cyclone Vardah
 Cyclone Thane

References

External links
 second strongest cyclone since 1996' – The New Indian Express

2018 in India
2018 North Indian Ocean cyclone season
Very severe cyclonic storms
October 2018 events in Asia
Tropical cyclones in India
Tropical cyclones in 2018